The Battle of Denain was fought on 24 July 1712 as part of the War of the Spanish Succession. It resulted in a French victory, under Marshal Villars, against Dutch and Austrian forces, under Prince Eugene of Savoy.

It was the war's last battle in Flanders and one of the most consequential, breaking the Grand Alliance's ability to threaten Paris and reversing nearly seven years of French territorial losses. In itself a local and tactical victory, Denain was made decisive by its relentless exploitation by Villars, who skillfully maneuvered to reclaim strategic border fortifications that would blunt any allied effort to renew their advance on Paris and dictate peace terms to Louis XIV.

Background

The War of Spanish Succession had raged since 1701. After over a decade of war, France was in a dark period, both financially and militarily. The early victories of Marshal Villars at the Battle of Friedlingen and the Battle of Höchstadt were followed by numerous defeats to the Allied forces, most notably the armies under Prince Eugene of Savoy and the Duke of Marlborough. In 1708, after the rout of Oudenaarde, nearly all the strongholds of northern France were under the control of the Austro-Dutch-British coalition. There was also an economic crisis, and the winter of 1708-1709 was one of the most rigorous of the 18th century, leading to famine and high mortality.

The command of the French northern army went to Marshal Villars in 1709, who wasted no time in seeing to its reorganising the defeated French forces. When the Allied campaign led by Prince Eugene and the Duke of Marlborough engaged the French at Malplaquet, Villars was wounded and the French retreated from the field, but the Allies suffered twice as many casualties and their campaign soon sputtered out. France's precarious position had been stabilized, the Allies were unable to achieve their goal of forcing harsh terms on the Bourbons and the war continued. In Britain the anti-war Tories managed to gain power in 1710 and were increasingly prepared to agree terms with French negotiators. Despite this the 1711 campaign saw Marlborough enjoy further success by leading his army through the lines Ne Plus Ultra and capturing Bouchain, a key fortress in northern France.

Marlborough had fallen out of favour with Queen Anne and his political opponents manoeuvred to have him dismissed as Captain General in December 1711.

Prelude
In May 1712, Villars prepared to take the offensive. The French gathered an army of 200,000 men on the northern border, stretching from Arras to Cambrai. The Allied northern army was positioned along the Scarpe between Douai and Marchiennes, occupying the communes of Denain and Landrecies.

The successful but controversial Marlborough had recently been relieved of his command, and the British forces were now under the leadership of the Irish general and politician the Duke of Ormonde, who was under secret orders from the Harley government not to fight alongside the Allies under the Prince of Savoy. In June, Prince Eugene besieged and captured Le Quesnoy. The Duke of Ormonde withdrew his forces during the siege, leading to a rift between the British and the rest of the Allies. In line with their prior agreement with the French, Ormonde removed his men towards Dunkirk. Although Ormonde ordered the German troops in British pay, such as the Hanoverians, they refused and remained with Eugene.

Battle sequence

After a detailed examination of the enemy dispositions, Villars decided in the greatest secrecy to attack Denain. Elements of the French cavalry were sent to seize the various bridges crossing the river Selle, which ran through le Cateau to join the Scheldt opposite Denain. During the evening, a French detachment also took up positions around a mill at Haspres, blocking the river that crossed there. That night, the French infantry began to march towards Prince Eugene's forces at Landrecies. In response to the threat, Prince Eugene reinforced Landrecies, weakening the Allied right wing, under the Earl of Albemarle, which held Denain.

At dawn, however, Villars swung the line of advance of his army and aimed it behind the cover of the Selle in three columns at Denain. At five o'clock in the morning, Villars and his principal lieutenants drew up their plan of attack at Avesnes-le-Sec. They chose the windmill there as a vantage point for observation of the surrounding lowland. 24,000 French infantry would attack the 10,500 strong Dutch garrison of Denain. At seven o’clock, the French infantrymen reached Neuville-sur-Escaut and were immediately ordered to seize the bridges across the Scheldt. At eight o’clock, the Allies were surprised to discover the large French presence in the area. The Earl of Albemarle, at the head of the Dutch garrison in and around Denain, warned Prince Eugene, but the Prince of Savoy was then not greatly concerned. By one o'clock in the afternoon, the attack had developed to the point of an assault on the palisade at Denain. The French sappers led the infantry against heavy fire and took Denain at the point of the bayonet. Many defenders were killed, and the remaining Dutch infantry attempted to escape across the mill bridge. However, it collapsed during the retreat, and hundreds of Allied troops drowned.

Realising the gravity of the situation, Prince Eugene attempted to force his way across the Scheldt at Prouvy to help Albemarle. Under the command of the Prince de Tingry, French regiments held the bridge at Prouvy against repeated Austrian attacks. Finally, as the day drew to a close, the French destroyed the bridge to prevent it falling into the hands of the enemy. That left the Prince of Savoy's army blocked on the left flank by the Scheldt, and the Allies could not counterattack to retake Denain. There, Albemarle and his staff were taken prisoner, together with some 4,100 troops. The Allies suffered 6,500 losses, mostly borne by the Dutch, while French casualties were 2,100.

Aftermath
The battle was not immediately recognised to be as decisive as it turned out to be; most of Prince Eugene's army was relatively unscathed. However, with the loss of Denain, the Allied position began to unravel, and over the next few months, the French recovered most of the towns that they had lost in the region in the previous years.

Almost immediately, Villars began a siege of the key allied supply base at Marchiennes, whose 100 cannon fell into French hands along with up to 9,000 prisoners and large volumes of stores and equipment. This movement threatened Eugene's line of communications, compelling the Austrians to lift the siege of Landrecies and retire north. Villars responded by seizing Douai (31 July) and Le Quesnoy (8 October) after short sieges. The loss of Le Quesnoy alone cost the Allies 3,000 killed or wounded. Villars next moved against Bouchain, the site of Marlborough's last triumph, taking the city 19 October and effectively restoring Louis XIV's pre-war territory in Flanders.

When news of the victory reached Versailles the court erupted in an outpouring of joy; Louis XIV was reportedly so moved that, for the first time in his sixty-year reign, the monarch thanked his courtiers for their support.

With French territorial losses in the north erased and Louis XIV's realm secure, the decade-long war in Flanders came to a close. Few other theatres held comparable promise for advancing the Allied war aims: in the Alps, Marshal Berwick with some 35,000 men safely contained the opposing 50,000 Austrians and Savoyards; in Catalonia the Allies under Starhemberg were reeling after defeats at Brihuega and Villaviciosa; on the Portuguese frontier, the remaining Anglo-Portuguese army was falling back before a Spanish army under the Marquis de Bay, removing the last serious threat to Philip V's succession; on the Rhine, the Duke of Württemberg could only bombard French lines, to which the French responded with cavalry raids into Germany before both sides settled into winter quarters.

Against this backdrop, the Dutch Estates General joined the British in negotiating a separate peace with Louis XIV, forcing Eugene to march the Imperial army back to Germany to continue the war in the Rhineland. When Villars and Eugene renewed operations in this new theatre the following season, the Frenchman again emerged victorious, taking the strongpoints of Freiburg and Landau and compelling the Emperor to sue for peace. The two men were then given power to negotiate a peace agreement and eventually drew up the terms of the Treaty of Rastatt which finally brought the last of the fighting to an end. Eugene's reputation soon recovered when he won a major victory by defeating the Turks at the 1717 Siege of Belgrade.

References

Sources 
 Chandler, David G. Marlborough as Military Commander. Spellmount Ltd, (2003). 
 
 Henderson, Nicholas. Prince Eugen of Savoy. Weifenfeld and Nicolson, 1964.
 
 Chase Maenius. The Art of War[s]: Paintings of Heroes, Horrors and History. 2014.

External links
 Celebration of the tricentenary in Denain, July 2012

Denain
Denain 1712
Denain 1712
Denain 1712
Denain 1712
History of Nord (French department)
Denain 1712
Denain
1712 in the Holy Roman Empire
1712 in France